Ecole Maïmonide is a French international secondary school in Casablanca, Morocco. A part of the AEFE school network, it serves the levels collège and lycée (junior and senior high school).

References

External links
 Lycée Maïmonide 

French international schools in Casablanca
Jewish schools in Morocco
Jews and Judaism in Casablanca